"Brazil We Flexing" is a single by Brazilian rapper MC Guimê, featuring American rapper Soulja Boy.

Music video 
The music video was released on September 22, 2014, 19:00 at the MC Guimê's channel in YouTube, and made available for digital download on iTunes on the same day. In just over forty-eight hours, the video exceeded the number of 1 million views on YouTube.

Charts

Notes 

2014 singles
Male vocal duets
Soulja Boy songs
MC Guimê songs
2014 songs
Songs about Brazil